The borate fluorides or fluoroborates are compounds containing borate or complex borate ions along with fluoride ions that form salts with cations such as metals. They are in the broader category of mixed anion compounds.  They are not to be confused with tetrafluoroborates (BF4) or the fluorooxoborates which have fluorine bonded to boron.

Examples

References

Borates
Fluorides
Mixed anion compounds